Bolton Township is a township in Cowley County, Kansas, USA.  As of the 2000 census, its population was 1,754.

Geography
According to the USGS, it contains two cemeteries: Hope and Springside.

The streams of Negro Creek, Spring Creek and Spring Creek run through this township.

Transportation
Bolton Township contains one airport or landing strip, Haines Landing Field.

References
 USGS Geographic Names Information System (GNIS)

External links
 City-Data.com

Townships in Cowley County, Kansas
Townships in Kansas